The 2015–16 Colorado Buffaloes women's basketball team represented the University of Colorado Boulder during the 2015–16 NCAA Division I women's basketball season. The Buffaloes, led by six-year head coach Linda Lappe, play their home games at the Coors Events Center and are members of the Pac-12 Conference. They finished the season 7–23, 2–26 in Pac-12 play to finish in the last place. They lost in the first round of the Pac-12 women's basketball tournament to Washington.

On March 7, Linda Happe resigned. She finished with a six-year record at Colorado of 105–92.

Roster

Schedule

|-
!colspan=9 style="background:#000000; color:#CEBE70;"| Exhibition

|-
!colspan=9 style="background:#000000; color:#CEBE70;"| Non-conference regular season

|-
!colspan=9 style="background:#000000; color:#CEBE70;"| Pac-12 regular season

|-
!colspan=9 style="background:#000000;"|  Pac-12 Women's Tournament

Rankings
2015–16 NCAA Division I women's basketball rankings

See also
2015–16 Colorado Buffaloes men's basketball team

References

Colorado Buffaloes women's basketball seasons
Colorado
Colorado Buff
Colorado Buff